Red Blood is a 1925 American silent Western film directed by J.P. McGowan and starring Al Hoxie, Lew Meehan and Eddie Barry.

Cast
 Al Hoxie as Buck Marsden
 Marjorie Warfield as Edith Custer
 Lew Meehan as Dick 'Ace High' Willis
 Eddie Barry as Donald Custer 
 J.P. McGowan as Eagle Custer
 Frances Kellogg as Carlotta
 Walter Patterson as Sodapop
 Lem Sowards as 'Broom'

References

Bibliography
 Langman, Larry. A Guide to Silent Westerns. Greenwood Publishing Group, 1992.
 McGowan, John J. J.P. McGowan: Biography of a Hollywood Pioneer. McFarland, 2005.

External links
 

1925 films
1925 Western (genre) films
American black-and-white films
Films directed by J. P. McGowan
Silent American Western (genre) films
1920s English-language films
1920s American films